Lisa Eagen (born March 1, 1971) is a retired American team handball athlete.  She participated in the 1996 Summer Olympics in Atlanta, Georgia.

References

American female handball players
Olympic handball players of the United States
Handball players at the 1996 Summer Olympics
1971 births
Living people
Handball players at the 2003 Pan American Games
21st-century American women
Pan American Games gold medalists for the United States
Competitors at the 1995 Pan American Games
Medalists at the 1995 Pan American Games
Pan American Games medalists in handball
20th-century American women